You Complete Me may refer to:

You Complete Me (album), a 2006 album by Toni Gonzaga
"You Complete Me" (song), a 2009 song by Keyshia Cole
 You Complete Me (EP), a 2018 EP by ONF
"You Complete Me", a 1998 song by Stabbing Westward from Darkest Days